Ashgrove was a Legislative Assembly of Queensland electoral district in the state of Queensland, Australia from 1960 to 2017.

It was located in the northern suburbs of Brisbane, encompassing Alderley, Ashgrove, Enoggera, The Gap and Newmarket.  The electorate also contained the Enoggera Army Barracks and the Enoggera Reservoir, a state forest.

In the 2012 state election LNP leader Campbell Newman won the seat, and following his party's success in that election became Premier. In the 2015 election, Kate Jones, who had held the seat for Labor from 2006 to 2012, reclaimed the seat. In losing his seat and the Premiership, Newman became just the second Premier in Queensland history to be defeated in his electorate.

Ashgrove was abolished in the 2017 electoral redistribution, mostly being replaced by Cooper.

Members for Ashgrove

2015 election results

Polling

References

External links
 Electorate profile (Antony Green, ABC)

Ashgrove